Abhay Verma (born January 5, 1973) is an Indian lawyer and politician from Delhi belonging to Bharatiya Janata Party. He is a member of the Delhi Legislative Assembly. He is the vice president of the Delhi unit of the Bharatiya Janata Party.

Early life and education
Verma was born on 5 January 1973 to Bankey Bihari Verma and Urmila Devi. He received his LLB from University of Delhi in 1996.

Career
Verma is the vice president of Delhi unit of Bharatiya Janata Party. He was elected as a member of the Delhi Legislative Assembly from Laxmi Nagar on 11 February 2020.

Personal life
Verma was married to Amrita Prakash on November 30, 2001. They have two daughters.

Controversy
A video was released during North East Delhi riots where Verma led a march in Laxmi Nagar. The people of the march were seen chanting "Police ke hatyaaron ko, goli maaro saalon ko" (Shoot the people, who murdered the policeman). The people were also seen chanting "Jo Hindu hit ki baat karega, wohi desh pe raj karega" (People who talk about the welfare of Hindus, only they will rule in the country). After that incident, Verma claimed that it was raised by common people, not by his supporters.

Electoral performance

References 

Delhi MLAs 2020–2025
Living people
1973 births
Place of birth missing (living people)
Members of the Delhi Legislative Assembly
Indian lawyers
Delhi University alumni